Saji Surendran (born 19 July 1982) is an Indian film director working in the Malayalam film industry, known for films such as Ivar Vivahitharayal (2009) and Happy Husbands (2010).

Personal life
Saji Surendran was born to Surendran and Vijayalakshmi in Nedumangad, Thiruvananthapuram, Kerala, and attended Lourdes Mount School, at Vattapara. He completed his bachelor's degree from Mahatma Gandhi College, Thiruvananthapuram. When he was studying there, he also acted in TV Serials he also worked as assistant director of Viji Thampi in many movies and television serials. His brother Aji Surendran also acted in some TV serials. Saji is married to Sangeeta since 16 March 2005. The couple is having two twin boys Vedant and Virat born on 11 July 2011.

Career
Surendran was a serial director before 2008. In 2004 he received the Best Telefilm Award for his Manasam (Asianet) at the Kaveri Film Critics Television Awards. He is known for directing the television serials Manasam, Megham, Aalippazham, Mandharam, Daya, and Ammakkay.

He came to the film industry by directing Jayasurya-Bhama starring Ivar Vivahitharayal, which was a success at the box office and gave Jayasurya a big break. After Ivar Vivahitharayal, he directed Happy Husbands with a huge cast that included Jayasurya, Indrajith Sukumaran, Jayaram, Bhavana, Vandana Menon, Samvrutha Sunil and Rima Kallingal. Happy Husbands became the first major hit of 2010, and ran for more than 150 days at theatres throughout Kerala. Saji Surendran then directed Four Friends, starring Jayasurya, Jayaram, Kunchacko Boban, Meera Jasmine and Kamal Haasan in the guest role. It received mixed reviews.

Filmography

Television
 Manasam (Asianet)
 Megham (Asianet)
 Aalippazham (Surya TV)
 Mandharam (Kairali TV)
 Madhavam (Surya TV)
 Ammakayi (Surya TV)
 Daya (Kairali TV)

References

External links
 

21st-century Indian film directors
Malayalam film directors
Film directors from Thiruvananthapuram
Living people
1982 births